Dentin sialoprotein is a protein found in teeth.  It is one of the two proteins produced by the segmentation of dentin sialophosphoprotein.  Dentin sialoprotein can be found in the dentin immediately subjacent to cellular cementum, but not subjacent to acellular fibrous cementum.

References

Teeth
Proteins